Fanis Kofinas (born 5 September 1960) is a Greek former professional footballer who played as goalkeeper.

Club career
Kofinas started football from the amateur club of his village, AO Likoporia and was subsequently acquired by the club of Pelopas Kiato in 1980 with whose shirt he competed in the championship of the second division and in the championship of the third division.

In the summer of 1982, he was transferred to AEK Athens. He belonged to the "yellow-blacks" for 10 years, but spent most of that time on loan to other clubs, while in the seasons he was on the team's roster he was almost always a substitute. From 1983 to 1985 he was loaned to Korinthos, while from 1985 to 1987 he was again loaned to the team of Ionikos. He returned to AEK in 1987 and during the season he got most of his chances in the team. However, a goal he conceded in a derby against Panathinaikos in 1988 from Chatziathanasiou  "haunted" him for the rest of his career, since it was a rather weak long shot that went through his hands and finally cost AEK the draw. In 1990 he spent his best days in AEK after having a very good performance and won the League Cup with the team, where Dušan Bajević used him as a starter. In the end, however, he did not manage to establish himself in the starting line-up even after these appearances and left the team in 1992 with a total of only 13 appearances in the league. Being on the team's roster, he celebrated 2 Championships, 1 Cup, 1 Super Cup and the League Cup. After AEK, he played for 2 years in Egaleo, and one in Acharnaikos before ending his professional career.

After football
After the end of his career, Fanis dealt with the science he has studied, as he is a mathematics teacher.

Honours

AEK Athens 
Alpha Ethniki: 1988–89, 1991–92
Greek Cup: 1982–83
Greek Super Cup: 1989
Greek League Cup: 1990

References

1960 births
Living people
Greek footballers
Super League Greece players
AEK Athens F.C. players
P.A.S. Korinthos players
Ionikos F.C. players
Egaleo F.C. players
Acharnaikos F.C. players
Association football goalkeepers
People from Corinthia